The 1955 Grand Prix motorcycle racing season was the seventh F.I.M. Road Racing World Championship Grand Prix season. The season consisted of eight Grand Prix races in five classes: 500cc, 350cc, 250cc, 125cc and Sidecars 500cc. It began on 1 May, with Spanish Grand Prix and ended with Nations Grand Prix in Italy on 4 September.

1955 Grand Prix season calendar

Standings

Scoring system
Points were awarded to the top six finishers in each race. Only the four best races counted in the Sidecars, 125cc and 250cc, while in the 350cc and 500cc championships, the five best results were counted.

500cc final standings

350cc Standings

250cc Standings

125cc Standings

References
 Büla, Maurice & Schertenleib, Jean-Claude (2001). Continental Circus 1949–2000. Chronosports S.A. 

Grand Prix motorcycle racing seasons
Grand Prix motorcycle racing season